Adrian King may refer to:

 Adrian King (basketball) (born 1971), Australian wheelchair basketball player
 Adrian King (cricketer) (born 1952), West Indian cricketer
 Adrian R. King, American public official